Gentianella cernua is a species of plant in the family Gentianaceae. It is endemic to Ecuador. Its natural habitat is subtropical or tropical high-altitude grassland.

References

cernua
Endemic flora of Ecuador
Least concern plants
Taxonomy articles created by Polbot